Oakle Street railway station served the village of Oakle Street, Gloucestershire, England from 1851 to 1964 on the Gloucester-Newport line.

History 
The station opened on 19 September 1851 by the South Wales Railway. It closed on 31 March 1856 but reopened on 2 July 1870, before closing permanently on 2 November 1964.

References

External links 

Disused railway stations in Gloucestershire
Railway stations in Great Britain opened in 1851
Railway stations in Great Britain closed in 1856
Railway stations in Great Britain opened in 1870
Railway stations in Great Britain closed in 1964
Former Great Western Railway stations
Beeching closures in England
1851 establishments in England
1964 disestablishments in England